The second season of the animated television series BoJack Horseman premiered exclusively via Netflix's web streaming service on July 17, 2015. The season consists of 12 episodes.

Cast and characters

Main 
 Will Arnett as BoJack Horseman
 Amy Sedaris as Princess Carolyn
 Alison Brie as Diane Nguyen
 Paul F. Tompkins as Mr. Peanutbutter
 Aaron Paul as Todd Chavez

Recurring

Guest

Episodes

Reception
On Rotten Tomatoes the second season holds an approval rating of 100%, based on 17 critics, with an average rating of 8.9/10. The site's critical consensus reads, "BoJack Horseman truly comes into its own during season two, maturing into an ambitious comedy that sensitively blends wackiness with dark, nuanced drama". On Metacritic, the season has a score of 90 out of 100, based on 7 critics, indicating "universal acclaim".

References

2015 American television seasons
BoJack Horseman seasons